Ashmun is a surname that may refer to:

 Eli P. Ashmun (1770–1819), Massachusetts State Representative 1803–04, Massachusetts State Senator 1808–10, Massachusetts Governor's Councilman 1816, U.S. Senator from Massachusetts 1816–18. Father of George Ashmun
 George Ashmun (1804–1870), Massachusetts State Representative 1833–37, Massachusetts State Senator 1838–40, U.S. Representative from Massachusetts 1845–51, delegate to the Republican National Convention 1860. Son of Eli P. Ashmun
George Parish Ashmun, doctor and state senator in Ohio who served in the Union Army and served as mayor of Hudson, Ohio
Jehudi Ashmun (April 21, 1794 – August 25, 1828), religious leader and social reformer in New England
Margaret Ashmun (July 10, 1875 – March 15, 1940), writer from Wisconsin
Eli P. Ashmun (June 24, 1770 – May 10, 1819), United States Senator from Massachusetts

See also
Ashmun Institute, predecessor of Lincoln University (Pennsylvania)
Ashmun Street in Monrovia, Liberia 
Ashmun Bay in Michigan